The 2022 National budget of Bangladesh was presented by the Minister of Finance AHM Mustafa Kamal on 9 June 2022. The National budget is for the fiscal year beginning on 1 July 2022, and ending on 30 June 2023. The budget was the 14th presented by the Awami League-led Grand Alliance of Prime Minister Sheikh Hasina since returning to office in 2009. The budget was the third to be presented since the outbreak of the COVID-19 pandemic and focused primarily on economic recovery from the pandemic and ameliorating the impact of rising inflation as a result of the Russia-Ukraine conflict.

History 
The National Budget is the annual financial statement of Bangladesh; an estimate of income and expenditure of the Government of Bangladesh on a periodical basis. Under Article 87.(1) of the Constitution of Bangladesh, it is a compulsory task of the government. Upon achieving independence, the first budget of Bangladesh was presented by Tajuddin Ahmad in 1972 and totaled . This was the 51st national budget of Bangladesh. Former Ministers of Finance AMA Muhith and Saifur Rahman presented 12 budgets each for their respective governments, the highest number in Bangladesh's history. The 2022 budget was the 51st in the nation's history and the 23rd budget to be presented by an Awami League-led government.

Significant announcements 
This consists of  allocated for operating and other expenditures, while  has been allocated for the Annual Development Programme.
 The total GDP growth rate was fixed at 7.5% with an estimated total GDP of 
 The total deficit of the budget is  equivalent to 5.5% of GDP, a 0.7% decrease from the previous fiscal year. The government intends to finance the deficit through the use of various domestic and external sources.
 The average inflation rate was projected to be 5.6%. Kamal stated that rising inflation was as a result of external factors beyond the control of the government such as the rise in oil prices, depreciation of the Taka against the US dollar, increase in inflation among trading partners, disruption of the global supply chain and the Russia-Ukraine conflict. The Finance Minister pledged the government would do its utmost to contain inflation and provide relief for the masses.
 The Minister announced an initiative to allow Deputy Commissioners of Taxes to cut supplies of utilities such as power, water and gas to businesses who deliberately evade the payment of taxes.

References

Further reading 

Full text of Budget speech delivered by Minister of Finance AHM Mustafa Kamal MP

National budgets of Bangladesh
2022 government budgets
2022 in Bangladesh